Charles Domery ( 1778 – after 1800), later also known as Charles Domerz, was a Polish soldier serving in the Prussian and French armies, noted for his unusually large appetite. Serving in the Prussian Army against France during the War of the First Coalition, he found that the rations of the Prussians were insufficient and deserted to the French Army in return for food. Although generally healthy, he was voraciously hungry during his time in the French service, and ate any available food. While stationed near Paris, he was recorded as having eaten 174 cats in a year, and although he disliked vegetables, he would eat  of grass each day if he could not find other food. During service on the French ship Hoche, he attempted to eat the severed leg of a crew member hit by cannon fire, before other members of the crew wrestled it from him.

In February 1799, the Hoche was captured by British forces and the crew, including Domery, were interned in Liverpool, where he shocked his captors with his voracious appetite: despite being put on ten times the usual rations, he ate the prison cat and at least 20 rats, and would often eat the prison candles. In one experiment, over the course of a day he ate  of raw cow's udder, raw beef and tallow candles and four bottles of porter, all of which he ate and drank without defecating, urinating, or vomiting.

Almost everything known about Domery comes from a 1799 account by Dr. J. Johnston in the Medical and Physical Journal, based largely upon information provided by Dr. Thomas Cochrane.

Appearance and behaviour 
Charles Domery (later also known as Charles Domerz) was born in Benche, Poland, in around 1778. From the age of 13, Domery had an unusually large appetite. He was one of nine brothers, all of whom Domery said suffered from the same condition. Domery recalled that his father was a hearty eater and generally ate his meat half-boiled, but was too young to recall the quantity. The only illness Domery was aware of in the family was an outbreak of smallpox in his youth, which was survived by all the family.

He had long, brown hair and grey eyes, was smooth-skinned, and was described as having a "pleasant countenance". Doctors observing Domery saw no signs of mental illness and although illiterate, he was considered of normal intelligence by his crewmates and by the prison doctors who studied him. Despite eating vast amounts of food, it was noted by the doctors studying him that he never vomited, other than when fed large amounts of roasted or boiled meat. He showed no outward signs of ill health, and doctors observing him noted that his eyes were lively and his tongue clean. His pulse was regular at around 84 BPM, and his body temperature normal. His muscles were normally formed, but observed by doctors to be weaker than usual, although during his time in the army, he had marched 14 French leagues (approximately 25 mi/42 km) in a day with no ill effects.

It was observed that immediately after going to bed, generally at about 8:00 pm, Domery would begin to sweat profusely. After one to two hours lying awake and perspiring, he would fall asleep before waking at around 1:00 am extremely hungry, regardless of what he had eaten before going to bed. At this time, he would eat any available food, or if no food was available, he would smoke tobacco. At around 2:00 am, he would go back to sleep, and wake again at between 5:00 and 6:00 am, sweating heavily; as soon as he got out of bed, the sweating would cease, starting again whenever he ate.

Military service 
By the age of 13, Domery had enlisted in the Prussian Army, and became part of an army besieging Thionville during the War of the First Coalition. The Prussian Army was suffering from food shortages which Domery found intolerable; he entered the town and surrendered to the French commander who rewarded him with a large melon, which Domery immediately ate, including the rind. He was then given a wide variety of other foodstuffs by the French general, all of which he ate straight away.

Domery then enlisted with the French Revolutionary Army, and shocked his new comrades with his unusual eating habits and voracious appetite. Granted double rations, and using his pay to buy additional food whenever possible, he nonetheless suffered from extreme hunger; while based in an army camp near Paris, Domery ate 174 cats in a single year, leaving only the skins and bones, and ate  of grass each day if other food was unavailable.

He preferred raw meat to cooked; while his favourite dish was a raw bullock's liver, he would eat any available meat. While in service on board the French ship Hoche, a sailor's leg was shot off by cannon fire, and Domery grabbed the severed limb and began to eat it until a crew member wrestled it from him and threw it into the sea.

Capture 
In October 1798, a Royal Navy squadron under the command of Sir John Borlase Warren captured the Hoche off the coast of Ireland, and those on board, including Domery, were interned in a prison camp near Liverpool. The British guards were shocked by Domery's appetite, and agreed to place him on double rations. These were insufficient, and his rations were increased until eventually he was granted the rations of ten men each day. Rations for prisoners of war in this period were paid for by the country in whose army the prisoners had served.

Domery remained hungry, and was recorded as having eaten the prison cat and at least 20 rats which had strayed into his cell. Domery also ate the medicines of those prisoners in the camp's infirmary who refused to take them, suffering no apparent adverse effects as a result. It was also recorded that he would regularly eat the prison's candles, and that if his ration of beer was exhausted, he would resort to drinking water to wash down his food. (To reduce the risk of water-borne disease, troops were issued rations of mildly alcoholic beverages such as small beer and diluted rum, and drinks such as tea and coffee which involved boiling water before drinking.)

Experimental subject 

The prison commander brought his unusual captive to the attention of the Sick and Hurt Commissioners, the body then responsible for all medical services in the Royal Navy and for overseeing the welfare of prisoners of war. , a member of the commission, and Dr Cochrane, Fellow of the Royal College of Physicians of Edinburgh, performed an experiment to test Domery's eating capacity and tolerance for unusual foods. At 4:00 am, Domery was awakened and fed 4 lbs (1.8 kg) of raw cow's udder, which was eaten without hesitation. At 9:30 am, he was given a meal of 5 lbs (2.3 kg) of raw beef, twelve large tallow candles totalling one pound (453 g), and a bottle of porter, all of which were consumed. At 1:00 pm, Domery was given another meal of a further 5 lbs of beef, a pound (453 g) of candles, and three large bottles of porter, all of which were also eaten and drunk. During the course of the experiment, he did not defecate, urinate or vomit at any point, his pulse remained regular and his skin did not change temperature. Upon Domery's return to his quarters at 6:15 pm following the conclusion of the experiment, he was recorded as being of "particularly good cheer", and danced, smoked his pipe and drank a further bottle of porter.

Medical explanation for his appetite 
The cause of Domery's appetite is not known. While there are other documented cases of similar behaviour from this period none of the subjects other than Domery's contemporary Tarrare were autopsied, and there have been no modern documented cases of polyphagia (excessive appetite) as extreme as Domery. Hyperthyroidism can induce an extreme appetite and rapid weight loss, while Bondeson (2006) speculates that Domery possibly suffered from a damaged amygdala or ventromedial nucleus; it is known that injuries to the amygdala or ventromedial nucleus in animals can induce polyphagia.

Later life and legacy 
It is not recorded what became of Domery, or of the other Hoche captives, following their internment, and it is not known if he returned to Poland or remained in Liverpool. The case of Charles Domery briefly returned to public notice in 1852 when it came to the attention of Charles Dickens, who wrote of Domery that "Now, it is my opinion, that a man like this, dining in public on the stage of Drury Lane, would draw much better than a mere tragedian, who chews unsubstantial words instead of wholesome beef".

See also 
 Tarrare, a French showman and soldier, noted for his unusual eating habits.
 Michel Lotito, a French entertainer known as Monsieur Mangetout (Mr. "Eat-All").

Notes

References

Bibliography 

 
 
 
 
 
 
 
 

1770s births
French military personnel of the French Revolutionary Wars
Napoleonic Wars prisoners of war held by the United Kingdom
Polish cannibals
Polish prisoners of war
Polish soldiers
Polyphagia
Prussian Army personnel
Year of death unknown
Place of death unknown